The A-League Men is the top and only professional soccer league in Australia. Since its inaugural season in 2005–06, more than thirty individual players have scored hat-tricks in A-League Men matches, including five players who have scored four or more goals in a match.

Notable events
 The first hat-trick was scored by Ante Milicic for Newcastle Jets in a win over New Zealand Knights.
 In the 2007 A-League Grand Final, Archie Thompson scored five goals in Melbourne Victory's win over Adelaide United.
 Two hat-tricks have been scored in a single match on two occasions. The first was when Marcos Flores and Sergio van Dijk both scored three goals for Adelaide United against North Queensland Fury in January 2011. The second was when Jamie Maclaren scored three goals for Melbourne City and Roy O'Donovan scored three goals for Brisbane Roar in November 2019.
 Shane Smeltz and Bobô are the only players to have scored hat-tricks in consecutive matches.
 Henrique is currently the only player to have scored a hat-trick after coming on as a substitute.
 Besart Berisha holds the record for the fastest ever A-League Men hat-trick, scoring three goals in six minutes for Brisbane Roar against Adelaide United.
 Maclaren have scored the most hat-tricks, with six.

Hat-tricks

Note: The results column shows the home team score first

Multiple hat-tricks
The following table lists the number of hat-tricks scored by players who have scored two or more hat-tricks.

See also
A-League Golden Boot
Lists of hat-tricks

Notes

References

External links
 A-League Men official website

hat-tricks
hat-tricks
A-League Men